The 2017 Women's Asian Individual Squash Championships is the women's edition of the 2017 Asian Individual Squash Championships, which serves as the individual Asian championship for squash players. The event took place at Express Avenue Mall in Chennai from 26 to 30 April 2017. Defending champion Nicol David decided to skip the event. Joshana Chinappa defeated her compatriot Dipika Pallikal to win her first Asian Individual Squash Championship title.

Seeds

Draw and results

Finals

Top half

Bottom half

Source:

See also
2017 Men's Asian Individual Squash Championships
Asian Individual Squash Championships

References

External links
Asian Individual Squash Championships 2015 SquashSite website

2017 in squash
Squash in Asia
Squash tournaments in India
2017 in Indian women's sport
2017 in women's squash
International sports competitions hosted by India